Stomopteryx orthogonella is a moth of the family Gelechiidae. It was described by Staudinger in 1871. It is found in central and southern European Russia and Ukraine.

References

Moths described in 1871
Stomopteryx